Thysanoteuthis rhombus, also known as the diamond squid, diamondback squid, or rhomboid squid, is a large species of squid from the family Thysanoteuthidae which is found worldwide, throughout tropical and subtropical waters. T. rhombus is given its name for the appearance of the fins that run the length of the mantle. They are a fast growing species with a lifespan of approximately 1 year. The diamond squid is the only cephalopod species known to be monogamous. T. rhombus often preys on fish and other small cephalopods at varying water depths. This species is commercially fished in Japan, specifically in the Sea of Japan and Okinawa.

Description 
Thysanoteuthis rhombus are distinguishable by the presence of arms with two series of suckers, whereas the tentacular clubs have four. It lacks photophores. T. rhombus is named for its fins, which run in equal length along the mantle, giving the appearance of a rhombus. The species is able to grow up to 100 cm (3.3 ft) in mantle length and a maximum weight of 30 kg, although it averages around 20 kg. T. rhombus is not an active swimmer and propels itself slowly using its triangular fins, although the species is able to make powerful contractions of its mantle to escape predation.

The lifespan of T. rhombus is 1 year. Males mature at a mantle length between 400 to 550mm (170 to 200 days of age) while females mature at a mantle length between 550 to 650mm (230 to 250 days).

Behavior 
T. rhombus has a relatively low population density, which has led to a unique situation among squids, namely monogamy, where male and female couples of the same size remain together from their juvenile stage until death.  The species feeds during the daytime at deep water levels and during the night at shallow water levels. T. rhombus are often found in pairs, but groups up to 20 have been recorded.

T. rhombus typically inhabits open ocean waters of the subtropical and tropical locations with temperatures of >20 °C.  The diamond squid was found to be largely inactive or even die at depths of 0–100m due to sudden drops in temperatures below 15 °C.

Diet 
In subsurface water levels, T. rhombus juveniles were found to feed on crustaceans, small cephalopods and fishes. As adults, the stomach contents of the Diamond squid were found to consist mostly of nonactive fishes at water depths of 400 to 650m.

Predation 
The predators that feed on T. rhombus include various species of ommastrephid squids, dolphin fish, lancet fish, tuna, swordfish, Gempylus serpens, and sharks. Other predators include mammals such as dolphins, rough-toothed dolphin, false killer whale and sperm whale.

Reproduction

The pairing of males and females occurs at an immature stage where mantle length is less than 100mm and pairs remain monogamous. Mating occurs in a head-to-head position, in which the male uses its hectocotylus to attach to the female's buccal membrane to transfer its spermatophores. Spawning is year round in tropical waters and lasts for 2–3 months, but in temperate regions spawning is more restricted to summer or early autumn periods and warmer currents. T. rhombus is known to be an intermittent spawner and is known to have multiple spawning in succession. Females will produce secretions of gel-like substance from nidamental glands, similar to the Japanese flying squid, during spawning that will enter the water and swell. This swollen secretion will then be molded by the female into a cylinder. Female's oviductal glands will then begin to form two mucous threads, each with one row of eggs, which will fuse into a single cord containing a double row of eggs in the mantle cavity. The fused cord exits through into the water through the funnel where the eggs are met and fertilized with spermatozoa from seminal receptacles that were attached to the female's buccal membrane. The fertilized egg cord is then wound onto the cylinder. A female can produce 8 to 12 masses if properly utilizing its vitelline oocytes.

Commercial value 
T. rhombus is targeted by growing fisheries in near southern and central Japan due to its firm and flavorful flesh. The main fishing grounds are in the Sea of Japan, Okinawa Prefecture, and Kagoshima Prefecture. Majority, about 90%, of captures are located in the Sea of Japan and Okinawa. The Sea of Japan fishery runs from July to February, while the fishery in Okinawa runs primarily between November to April. To capture the diamond squid in the Sea of Japan, inshore trap nets and free-floating angling gear called "taru-nagashi" are used. In Okinawa, free-floating angling gear called "Hata-nagashi" is used for capture.

"Taru-nagashi" is gear that consists of a vertical weighted long line with two or three artificial lures and with two or three rows of stainless steel hooks. At the other end of the line, an orange fluorescent buoy lays on its side on the surface until a squid hooks onto the line, which causes buoy stands up to alert the fisherman. The caught squid are pulled up by hand or by using a winch, so it is primarily used during the day. "Hata-nagashi" is gear that was adapted for the oceanographic conditions of Okinawa Prefecture. It has several artificial lures attached to a longer main line than those used in the Sea of Japan. The line is attached to several buoys and a flag at the surface. This gear lead to the increase of catches of T. rhombus.

See also
Cephalopod size
Humboldt squid

References

 Tokalau, T. 2014. Giant squid market. The Fiji Times Online, 5 July 2014. 
 Giant potential: giant squid fishing could be next big Pacific market. Australia Network News, 10 July 2014.

External links

Tree of Life web project: Thysanoteuthis rhombus

Squid
Molluscs of the Atlantic Ocean
Molluscs of the Indian Ocean
Molluscs of the Pacific Ocean
Sushi
Cephalopods described in 1857
Taxa named by Franz Hermann Troschel